The Old Town Mall or Oldtown Mall is a mostly abandoned outdoor pedestrian shopping mall in the Old Town neighborhood of Baltimore, Maryland. The mall contains 64 stores, the majority of which are closed. The area has seen many periods of revival and decline in the past 200 years since its opening, and there are currently plans by developers in the area to revitalize the mall.

History

Old Town and Gay Street started to become a retail area when the City of Baltimore built the Bel Air Market in 1818. The sixth market to be constructed, Bel Air was designed to be a relief farmers market to serve the increasing commercial operations surrounding the area. The market helped boost business in Old Town, and the area became a diverse, bustling middle-class neighborhood, and the proximity to the city center made it an ideal place for families and downtown workers to live. Isaac Benesch’s Great Store was here. But, when the post-war era beckoned families to the suburbs, Gay Street suffered greatly. The population near the street fell, and Old Town became one of the poorer areas of the city. Without its customer base, the shops on the street were forced to close or adapt to the new customer demographic.

Redevelopment and decline
The Baltimore riot of 1968 was a turning point in the area. The City of Baltimore used the devastation as a way to revitalize Gay Street. Developers decided to convert the street into a pedestrian-only zone and name it the Old Town Mall. The street was repaved with bricks; planters, street lamps, and trees were added; and even a fountain was installed in the center along with a clock tower that would bear the name of the mall. More than $1.7 million had been spent on the project. In the late 60s, the area opened with "much fanfare" with government officials from across the country in attendance. One newspaper wrote that "Good things are happening in Old Town". But, by the 1980s, the area had already started resembling what it looked like before the revitalization, due to the fact that the city didn't remedy the high unemployment and poverty in Old Town. A few unsuccessful attempts were made to bring life back to the area, one involved tearing down the Bel Air Market to build a parking lot in hopes that a major grocery store chain would build a location at the mall. The area has been mostly unchanged since then.

The mall once contained a  Kaufman's department store in the former Benesch building, the only anchor. Today, a haunted house operates from this building each October since 2015. 

On March 25, 2015, two men were shot in the afternoon hours at the mall. Later, police arrested two men in connection with the shootings.

Restoration plans
Starting in 2016, developers from the Baltimore area emerged with plans to restore the area, capitalizing on the proximity to Johns Hopkins Hospital. Some plans include restoring Gay Street through the mall to increase business opportunities from car traffic. The redeveloped site could include new housing, office, and commercial space, and it could also include a farmer's market.

References

Old Town, Baltimore
Shopping malls in Maryland